The yellowish bulbul (Hypsipetes everetti) is a species of songbird in the bulbul family, Pycnonotidae.

Taxonomy and systematics 
The yellowish bulbul was originally described in the genus Criniger and later placed in the genus Ixos before being re-classified to the genus Hypsipetes in 2010. Alternate names for the streak-breasted bulbul include Everett's bulbul, plain-throated bulbul, and yellow-washed bulbul. The scientific name commemorates British colonial administrator and zoological collector Alfred Hart Everett.

Subspecies 
Two subspecies are currently recognized:
 H. e. everetti - (Tweeddale, 1877): Found in east-central and south-eastern Philippines 
 Sulu bulbul (H. e. haynaldi) - (Blasius, W, 1890):  Originally described as a separate species in the genus Criniger. Found in the Sulu Archipelago (south-western Philippines)
The Camiguin bulbul (H. catarmanensis) of Camiguin Sur was formerly considered a subspecies, but more recent studies have found it to be a distinct species.

Distribution and habitat
It is endemic to the Philippines. Its natural habitat is subtropical or tropical moist lowland forests.

References

yellowish bulbul
Birds of Mindanao
Endemic birds of the Philippines
yellowish bulbul
yellowish bulbul
Taxonomy articles created by Polbot